The 2000–01 Latvian Hockey League season was the tenth season of the Latvian Hockey League, the top level of ice hockey in Latvia. Seven teams participated in the league, and HK Riga 2000 won the championship.

Standings

External links
 Season hockeyarchives.info

Latvian Hockey League
Latvian Hockey League seasons
Latvian